
Year 744 (DCCXLIV) was a leap year starting on Wednesday (link will display the full calendar) of the Julian calendar. The denomination 744 for this year has been used since the early medieval period, when the Anno Domini calendar era became the prevalent method in Europe for naming years.

Events 
 By place 

 Europe 
 February – King Liutprand of the Lombards dies of natural causes after a 32-year reign, in which he has defeated the dukes of Spoleto and Benevento, bringing the Lombard Kingdom to the height of her power. He is succeeded by Hildeprand, called "the Useless" (nephew or grandson of Liutprand), as ruler of the Lombards.
 October – Hildeprand is deposed by the council of nobles, for his incompetence as ruler. He is succeeded by Ratchis (formerly duke of Friuli) as king of the Lombards, who makes peace with Pope Zachary.
 Pepin the Short, mayor of the palace of Neustria and Burgundy, invades the Swabian Jura (southwestern Germany), and chases Theudebald, Duke of Alamannia, from his mountain redoubt in Alsace.

 Switzerland 
 In 741 and 744, documents in the archives of St. Gallen Abbey describe the village of Kempraten as Centoprato, another document in 863 as Centiprata, inspired by the Latin name Centum Prata.
 A nunnery given by the Alamannic noblewoman Beata on Lützelau Island is first mentioned, and is in this year sold to Einsiedeln Abbey.
 Ufenau island in Switzerland is first mentioned in 741 as "Hupinauia", and in 744 as "Ubinauvia" — island of Huppan of Huphan.

 Britain 
 Wat's Dyke, a 40 mile (64 km) earthwork in present-day Wales, is constructed. The border between Mercia and Powys is set here. The date that Wat's Dyke was constructed is very uncertain, with some estimates linking the construction of the dyke to the 5th century and others to the early 9th century (approximate date).

 Arabian Empire 
 April 17 – Caliph Al-Walid II is besieged in his castle outside the city of Damascus. He is defeated and killed by Arab forces under Sulayman ibn Hisham. Al-Walid is succeeded by his cousin Yazid III, who dies shortly after of a brain tumor. 

 December – Marwan ibn Muhammad rebels against Yazid's designated successor Ibrahim ibn al-Walid, defeats the Umayyad forces under Sulayman ibn Hisham, and becomes caliph.

 Asia 
 Turkic subjects like Uyghur, Karluk and Basmyl, who are not the members of the Ashina clan, stage a coup. This ends the Turkic Empire and Ashina clan (except in Khazaria).
 Autumn – Li Bai (also Li Po), Chinese poet and skilled calligrapher, meets Du Fu for the first time.
 The Japanese imperial capital is moved from Kuni-kyō to Heijō-kyō.

 Central America 
February 4 – In the Third Tikal-Calakmul War in what is now Guatemala, the Mayan city-state of Tikal conquers the state of Naranjo and captures its king, Yax Mayuy Chan Chaak, who is subsequently sacrificed.  The conquest by Tikal destroys Calakmul's once powerful and extensive network of allies, vassal states and trade networks.

 By topic 

 Religion 
 Synod of Soissons. Called at the instigation of Pepin the Short and Boniface, archbishop and metropolitan, it secures the condemnation of the Frankish bishop Adalbert.
 Sturm, disciple of Boniface, establishes the Benedictine Abbey of Fulda (Hesse), as part of Boniface's mission to bring Christianity to the pagan tribes in Germany (or 742).
 June – Pope Zachary gives his approval by sending Abel, Grimo and Hartbert their palliums for the metropolitan sees of Reims, Rouen and Sens.Letter by Pope Zacharias to Boniface, dated Nov. 5, 744, ed. Tangl (no.58), tr. Emerton.
 Salih ibn Tarif proclaims himself a prophet among the Barghawata, a confederation of Berber tribes in modern-day western Morocco.

Births 
 Muhammad ibn Mansur al-Mahdi, Muslim caliph (or 745)

Deaths 
 April 17 – Al-Walid II, Muslim caliph (b. 706)
 September 25 – Yazid III, Muslim caliph (b. 701)
 He Zhizhang, Chinese poet
 Hildeprand, king of the Lombards
 Huoching, Alamannic nobleman
 Kül-chor, ruler (khagan) of the Turgesh
 Liutprand, king of the Lombards
 Özmiş Qaghan, ruler of the Second Turkic Khaganate
 Stephen IV, patriarch of Antioch

References

Sources